Dirk Sparidans (born 5 March 1989) is a Dutch male volleyball player. He is part of the Netherlands men's national volleyball team. On club level he plays for Vaše Kladno.

References

External links
Profile at FIVB.org

1989 births
Living people
Dutch men's volleyball players
Sportspeople from Tilburg
Dutch expatriates in the Czech Republic
Expatriate volleyball players in the Czech Republic